A Certain World: A Commonplace Book, by W. H. Auden, is an anthology of passages and quotations from other authors, selected by Auden, arranged alphabetically by subject. He called it  "a sort of autobiography." Subjects include time, sin, and landscapes. It was published in 1970.

References

External links
 The W. H. Auden Society

1970 books
Books by W. H. Auden
Essay collections